Aiyathurai Varnakulasingham Kulasingham (11 October 1890 – 16 January 1978) was a Ceylon Tamil lawyer, politician, journalist and editor of the Ceylon Daily News and Hindu Organ.

Early life and family
Kulasingham was born on 11 October 1890. He was educated at Jaffna College.

Kulasingham married Rasammah, daughter of Thambu, in 1910. They had three sons (Rudrasingam, Karalasingam and Jeganathan) and five daughters (Manonmani, Annapillai, Thilagam, Pathmaranee and Jeyamani).

Career
Kulasingham got involved in journalism whilst still a student, contributing articles to the Morning Star and The Times of Ceylon. He was later editor of the Ceylon Daily News (1925) and Hindu Organ, and special correspondent to the Manchester Guardian.

Kulasingham was also an advocate and practised law for more than 50 years. He was also a crown advocate.

Kulasingham was a founding member of the All Ceylon Tamil Congress (ACTC) in 1944 and served as joint secretary. He contested the 1947 parliamentary election in Kayts as the ACTC candidate but was defeated by Alfred Thambiayah by just 322 votes.

Death
Kulasingham died on 16 January 1978.

References

1890 births
1978 deaths
All Ceylon Tamil Congress politicians
Alumni of Jaffna College
Ceylonese advocates
People from Northern Province, Sri Lanka
People from British Ceylon
Sri Lankan Tamil editors
Sri Lankan Tamil journalists
Sri Lankan Tamil lawyers
Sri Lankan Tamil politicians